Forkhead box protein N3 is a protein that in humans is encoded by the FOXN3 gene.

This gene is a member of the forkhead/winged helix transcription factor family. Checkpoints are eukaryotic DNA damage-inducible cell cycle arrests at G1 and G2. Checkpoint suppressor 1 suppresses multiple yeast checkpoint mutations including mec1, rad9, rad53 and dun1 by activating a MEC1-independent checkpoint pathway. Alternative splicing is observed at the locus, resulting in distinct isoforms.

See also
 FOX proteins

References

Further reading

External links 
 

Forkhead transcription factors